The medical officer of health for London was a public elected position for the city of London established in 1848. It was the second municipal position of its kind in England, the first being William Henry Duncan for Liverpool. It was soon followed by the requirement for all regions of Greater London to have a medical officer of health.

Notible medical officers of health for London 

 Arthur Newsholme
 William Henry Duncan, Liverpool

 John Simon, 1848–1855
 Henry Letheby, 1855–1873
 John Simon, City of London (1848–1855)
 John Bristowe, Camberwell
 William Rendle, St. George Southwark (1856-1859)
 Edwin Lankester, St. James
 George M'Gonigle, Stockton-on-Tees (1924–39)
 C. Killick Millard, Leicester (1901–35)

See also 
 Metropolitan Commission of Sewers

References 

Health in London